The Bolivarian Games is a quadrennial event which began in 1938. The Games records in athletics are set by athletes who are representing one of the
ODEBO's member federations. The following list of records is assembled
from Athletics Weekly and from sources compiled in the Athletics at the 2009 Bolivarian Games webpage.

There is no information on wind and/or heats for early competitions.

Men's records

Women's records

Mixed records

Records in defunct events

Men's events

Women's events

References

External links

Bolivarian Games
Records
Bolivarian Games